Eric Guilyardi is a climate scientist at the Institut Pierre Simon Laplace / CNRS in France and professor of climate science at the University of Reading, in the UK. He is deputy director of the LOCEAN laboratory within IPSL and special advisor to CNRS on ocean and climate issues. He has published over 100 papers in peer-reviewed journals on topics including tropical climate variability, El Niño, ocean and climate, decadal variability and predictability, climate change, multi-model analysis, and state-of-the-art climate model development, and has been ranked as Highly Cited scientist in 2018. Eric Guilyardi was Contributing Author for IPCC TAR, has contributed as expert reviewer to the IPCC AR4 and IPCC SROCC, was a Lead Author for IPCC AR5 and Contributing Author for IPCC AR6. Eric Guilyardi has an active public engagement activity, for the general public, schools and the media. He has published several books for wider audiences on ocean, climate, science and society. He is President of the Office for Climate Education (OCE), under the auspices of UNESCO, which develops climate change education resources and professional development for teachers. He is also a member of the Scientific council of the French Ministry of Education and sits in the Ethics committee of CNRS.

References

External links
 https://pagesperso.locean-ipsl.upmc.fr/ericg/
 https://people.ncas.ac.uk/people/view/76
 http://www.oce.global/

Academics of the University of Reading
Living people
Year of birth missing (living people)
British climatologists